Pawan is an Indian actor who has appeared in Tamil language films. He made his debut in supporting role in Thimiru, before playing leading roles in Sengathu Bhoomiyilae and Thagaraaru.

Career
Pawan ventured into Tamil films by playing Kishore's henchman in Vetrimaaran's Polladhavan before starring as a police officer trying to outwit Nakul in Manohar's 2009 comedy Maasilamani, with both film going on to become successful ventures. He also played the role of a henchman in the Vijay-starrer Kuruvi (2008), with his work for the film preventing him from accepting offers for roles in Aegan and Silambattam.

Pawan next featured in Rathnakumar's family drama film Sengathu Bhoomiyilae (2012) as the film's lead character alongside Mirchi Senthil, but the film met with a low key release and mixed reviews. He then appeared as one of the four lead actors in Thagaraaru (2013) alongside Arulnithi, Tarun Shatriya and Aadukalam Murugadoss, winning critical acclaim for his performance. Pawan also appeared in a small role in the Ajith Kumar starrer Veeram (2014) portraying the role of the murdered son of the character played by Nassar. He starred in Vetrimaaran's Vada Chennai (2018) and Asuran (2019).

Filmography

Web series

References 

Indian male film actors
Male actors in Tamil cinema
Living people
1971 births